Camp Roosevelt may be:

 Camp Roosevelt, part of the Katahdin Scout Reservation
 Camp Theodore Roosevelt/R-C Scout Ranch - Arizona
 Roosevelt Scout Reservation - Salem County, New Jersey
 NF-1, Camp Roosevelt - (Camp Roosevelt Recreation Area), George Washington National Forest
 Camp Roosevelt,  Irondale Scout Reservation
 Camp Roosevelt,  Gettysburg Battlefield camps after the American Civil War
 Camp Roosevelt, Stalag VI-A, Hemer
 Camp Roosevelt (Chesapeake)
 Camp Roosevelt, Culebra, Puerto Rico